The 1908 All England Open Badminton Championships was a badminton tournament held at the London Rifle Brigade HQ, Islington, London, England, from March 3 to March 7, 1908.

Meriel Lucas won her fourth women's singles title and Henry Norman Marrett won his third men's singles title, the former reverted to a first to 11 points game format. Lucas also won her seventh women's doubles crown and second with G. L. Murray and she also won her first mixed doubles title partnering Norman Wood.

In the men's doubles F. Warner was listed as playing, it is believed to be Frank Abbatt playing under his middle name. This started the unusual occurrence of other players playing under assumed names in future years. The reason for this happening or being allowed is unknown.

Final results

Men's singles

Women's singles

Men's doubles

+alias

Women's doubles

Mixed doubles

References

All England Open Badminton Championships
All England Badminton Championships
All England Championships
All England Open Badminton Championships in London
All England Badminton Championships
All England Badminton Championships